Americas Energy and Climate Symposium is the first major energy event after the Summit of the Americas in April 2009, where U.S. President Barack Obama announced the formation of the Energy and Climate Partnership of the Americas (ECPA). ECPA is a voluntary and flexible framework for advancing energy security and combating climate change. The president invited all Western Hemisphere countries to be part of a united effort under the ECPA, and since then, the regional response has been overwhelmingly positive across the elements of the ECPA: energy efficiency, renewable energy, critical infrastructure, and energy development and solidarity to help alleviate poverty.

Energy efficiency and renewable energy are the major focus for the Americas Energy and Climate Symposium. The first Americas Energy and Climate Symposium took place on June 15 and 16 2009 and was hosted by the government of Peru.

Low Carbon Communities Program 

At the symposium, U.S. Energy Secretary Steven Chu announced a Low Carbon Communities Program, which will assist countries in developing energy efficiency and renewable energy programs that will reduce the carbon footprint of their urban communities. Through the initiative, USDOE will partner with participating countries to develop building energy standards and to adopt modern urban planning strategies, including transit-oriented development. DOE will provide technical assistance and limited funding to help achieve those goals.

Regional centers 

Energy leaders also announced the development of a Regional Energy Efficiency Center, supported by Peru, and a Regional Wind Center, supported by Mexico.

See also 
 Sustainability
 IRENA
 Major Economies Forum on Energy and Climate
 Plug-in hybrid

References 
 Original text from http://apps1.eere.energy.gov/news/news_detail.cfm/news_id=12593

External links 
 The United States and the 2009 Summit of the Americas:Securing Our Citizens’ Future (The White House).
  (US Climate Symposium).

Organization of American States
International renewable energy organizations
Renewable energy in the United States
Diplomatic conferences in Peru
21st-century diplomatic conferences (Americas)